The 1948 Campeonato Profesional was the first season of Colombia's top-flight football league. The tournament was started on August 15th, with the match Atlético Municipal against Universidad. 10 teams compete against one another and played each weekend until December 19th.

Background
The creation of the Colombian Football Federation dates back to 1924, but it was not until 1948 that succeeded in organizing a professional tournament. In the tournament 10 teams signed up (each had to pay a fee of 1,000 pesos): one of Barranquilla, two of Bogotá, two of Cali, two of Manizales, two of Medellín and two of Pereira. 252 players were registered as follows: 182 Colombians, 13 Argentines, 8 Peruvians, 5 Uruguayans, 2 Chileans, 2 Ecuadorians, 1 Dominican and 1 Spanish.

League system
Every team played two games against each other team, one at home and one away. Teams received two points for a win and one point for a draw. If two or more teams were tied on points, places were determined by goal difference. The team with the most points is the champion of the league.

Teams

a Municipal played its home games at Itagüí
b Universidad played its home games at Pereira

Final standings

Results

Top goalscorers

Source: RSSSF.com Colombia 1948

References

External links
Dimayor Official Page

Prim
Colombia
Categoría Primera A seasons